Zygfryd Joachim Weinberg (3 February 1930 – 8 August 2015) was a Polish athlete. He competed in the men's triple jump at the 1952 Summer Olympics.

References

1930 births
2015 deaths
Athletes (track and field) at the 1952 Summer Olympics
Polish male triple jumpers
Olympic athletes of Poland
Sportspeople from Bydgoszcz
Zawisza Bydgoszcz athletes